Rue or Rué is the surname of:

Danica Rue (born 1982), American weightlifter
Gérard Rué (born 1965), French former cyclist
Jean-Baptiste Rué (born 1974), French former rugby union player
Joe Rue (1898-1984), American Major League Baseball umpire
Joseph Rue, French World War II vice-admiral
Lea Rue, stage name of Belgian singer-songwriter Emma Lauwers (born 1993)
Loyal Rue (born 1944), American philosopher and writer
Marcel Rué (born 1926), Monegasque sports shooter
Nancy Rue, American Christian novelist
Rosemary Rue (1928-2004), British physician and civil servant
Sander Rue (born 1954), American politician
Sara Rue, American television actress born Sara Schlackman in 1979